Lizhou District, formerly Shizhong District, is a district of Guangyuan city, Sichuan Province, China. Lizhou is the former name of the city Guangyuan and encompasses the urban area of Guangyuan.

Education
The "micro school development alliance", which covers 14 schools in the district, was established by 14 school principals. In 2016 over 220 teachers work at those schools.

External links
Official website of Lizhou Government

References 

Districts of Sichuan
 
Guangyuan